A money train is one or more railcars used to collect cash fare revenue from stations on a subway system and return it to a central location for processing. This train was typically used to carry money bags guarded by transit police to deter robberies.

On the New York City Subway, a “money train” was first mentioned in 1905, a year after the system opened. Their trains were converted from subway cars that have been removed from passenger service. This has since been discontinued, with the last service running in January 2006. Two of the cars are preserved by the New York Transit Museum in Brooklyn.

The use of a train was necessary because of difficulties in getting to and from stations using over-street transport, and because, since the subway reaches every station, the rail system itself can be used to collect money from ticket machines. The 1995 American crime thriller film Money Train depicts a robbery of such a train.

Singapore's Mass Rapid Transit system introduced a four-car money train when the system was commissioned in 1987. Used to transfer cash trolleys from stations to a counting facility at Bishan Depot, the increased use of stored value tickets resulted in the train being decommissioned in 2007.

The Washington Metro system continues to use money trains as of 2021.

The Light Rail in Hong Kong uses money trains, which are regular passenger trains taken out of service, to collect fares from the ticket vending machines.

Pay car

In Australia, the reverse procedure occurred with the New South Wales Government Railways fleet of pay buses. A small self-powered railcar, they were used to deliver pay packets containing cash to employees at remote railway stations, as well as maintenance gangs working on the tracks. This operation remained in service until the 1980s when it was supplanted by electronic payments.

References

Fare collection systems
New York City Subway fare payment
Trains